Krishna Tithi Khan was born on 13 December 1989 in Gopalganj District, Bangladesh. Her father's name is Tapash Kumar Khan and mother's name is Niva Rani Khan. Krishna Tithi is basically a stage singer, also a music artist listed on Bangladesh Betar and Bangladesh Television (BTV). She is a Bangladeshi expatriate singer and she sang 18 states in the United States. She received the honor of the "New York State Assembly", "State Senate", "City Council" in 2016.

Career 

She started practicing singing in her childhood through her father. From 2000 to 2006, he practiced music from Chayanat and National Nazrul Academy. She became a famous singer of Bangladesh Television and an enlisted singer in Bangladesh Radio in 2004.

Award 
 1st-Champion – "Channel I Sherader Moha Juddho" – 2009

References 

21st-century Bangladeshi women singers
21st-century Bangladeshi singers
Living people
1989 births
People from Gopalganj District, Bangladesh